The 1987 Canadian Soccer League season was the first season of play for the Canadian Soccer League, a new Division 1 men's soccer league in the Canadian soccer pyramid.

Format
The schedule was not a balanced schedule based on the league principle of playing each club home and away due to travel concerns. The league was divided into two four-team division with each team playing each team in their division four times, twice at home and twice on the road, and playing the teams in the opposing division twice, once at home and once on the road for a total of twenty games. Following the season, the top three teams in each division would advance to the playoffs, with the division leaders earning a first round bye, to designate a national champion club.

Summary
The Canadian Soccer League was the second attempt to create a national professional league in Canada. Many teams were existing franchises from the non-professional provincial leagues, while others had come from semi-professional leagues, including Edmonton (Western Soccer Alliance), Hamilton (Canadian National Soccer League), and Toronto (CNSL and NASL), while some teams, such as the Vancouver 86ers were new. The league opened with a good start with sizable crowds and a fairly high level of play, but teams soon began to feel the financial pressure, particularly in the smaller markets.

The league's inaugural match took place on June 7, 1987 in Aylmer, Quebec between the National Capital Pioneers and the Hamilton Steelers and finished in a 1–1 draw, in a steady drizzle, in front 2,500 spectators.

The Eastern Division in 1987 consisted of National Capital Pioneers, Hamilton Steelers, Toronto Blizzard, and the North York Rockets.  The Western Division comprised the Calgary Kickers, Edmonton Brick Men, Vancouver 86ers, and the Winnipeg Fury.  Calgary and Hamilton won their divisions and both advanced to the finals in the playoffs. In the final, Calgary defeated Hamilton 2–1, at home, in a winner-take-all one game final.

Regular season

East Division

West Division

Overall

Playoffs
Home team on top.

Quarterfinal

Semifinal

Final

Statistics

Top scorers

Honours
The following awards and nominations were awarded for the 1987 season.

Most Valuable Player

League All-Stars

Reserves

Front office

Average home attendances

See also
 Canadian Professional Soccer League (1983) – previous season of D1 soccer in Canada

References

External links
Canadian Soccer League 1991 Media Guide and Statistics
1987 CSL Stats

Canadian Soccer League
Canadian Soccer League (1987–1992) seasons